Riccardo Mastrilli (born 30 May 1997) is an Italian football player who plays for Torrese .

Club career
He made his Serie C debut for Pontedera on 3 September 2017 in a game against Lucchese.

On 19 January 2019, he joined Bisceglie on loan.

On 10 October 2020, he moved to Eccellenza club Pontevomano.

References

External links
 

1997 births
Sportspeople from the Province of Teramo
Living people
Italian footballers
Association football defenders
U.S. Città di Pontedera players
S.S. Teramo Calcio players
A.S.D. Città di Giulianova 1924 players
A.S. Bisceglie Calcio 1913 players
Serie D players
Serie C players
Footballers from Abruzzo